Yeshiva Ohr Elchonon may refer to:

Yeshiva Ohr Elchonon (Jerusalem), a Jerusalem-based yeshiva
Yeshiva Ohr Elchonon Chabad/West Coast Talmudical Seminary, a Los Angeles-based yeshiva